Green train corridor describes a concept where train coach toilet waste is no longer disposed directly on tracks. The trains instead feature built-in technology so that toilet waste is stored in a tank under every coach toilet, and is discharged into large drainage canals built along the line beside the tracks in main halting junctions.

Announcement and Inauguration 

On 24 July 2016, railway minister Suresh Prabhu announced India's First Green Rail Corridor on Manamadurai - Rameswaram line for the first time in ''Southern Railways Madurai Division.

References

Indian Railways